Voroshilovka may refer to the following places:

 Aşıqlı in Azerbaijan, also known as Voroshilovka
 Voroshilovka in the Smolensk Oblast of Russia
 Voroshylivka in the Vinnytsia Oblast of Ukraine